The Jacob Fruitfield Food Group is a company that once produced food products in Ireland, but is now mainly a brand for imported foods targeted at the Irish market. It was formed by Fruitfield Foods' acquisition of the Republic of Ireland portion of Jacob's Biscuit Group in 2004 from Groupe Danone. The CEO and part-owner is Michael Carey. Other major shareholders include Lioncourt with a 36% stake.

The company is now part of brands owned by Valeo Foods.

It is the owner of many iconic brands that project an Irish identity - despite now being made elsewhere, with the factories in Tallaght and Ringsend all closed. Brands such as Jacob's, Bolands and Chef were all once made in Ireland, but are now imported. Products such as "Old Time Irish" marmalade continue to be sold on the Irish market despite no longer being produced in Ireland.

In 2009, Bolands was re-launched in new packaging with a much broader range as a budget alternative to Jacobs. In 2007, Jacobs took McVities to court for infringement of copyright. McVities launched Cream Crackers and Fig Rolls in the Irish market in similar packaging. It was revealed that McVities were also making the same products under contract for Jacobs and had even designed Jacobs labels for them.

In May 2009, Jacobs ceased production of biscuits at its home in Tallaght, Dublin. Production was moved to Portugal, Poland, the UK, France and Malta for cost reasons. Some minor production remains in Ireland with Wafer biscuits made in County Donegal, Real Irish products in Drogheda and premium oat biscuits in Cork. 220 people lost their jobs as a result of the closure in 2009.

Brands and sub-brands
Jacob's

Packed biscuits

Kimberley
Chocolate Kimberley
Mikado (cf. the antipodal Iced VoVo)
Chocolate Coated Biscuits
Chocolate Chip Cookies
Creams
Chocolate Mallows
Coconut Creams
Cookies
Digestive
Elite
Fig Rolls
Goldgrain
Ginger Nut
Oat Crumbles
Plain Biscuits
Rich Tea
Teatime
Afternoon Tea
USA Biscuits
TUC Crackers
Liga
Chocolate Fig Rolls
Cream Crackers
Jaffa Cakes
Camelot
Wafers
Windmill
Lincoln
Nice
Polo
Shortbread
Shortcake
Crunchers

Bars

Club Milk
Telex
Busker
Trio

Bolands
Custard Creams
Bourbon Creams

Fruitfield
Fruitfield Jam
Old Time Irish Marmalade

Chef
Chef Tomato Ketchup
Chef Brown Sauce
Chef Salad Cream

Clarendon
Silvermints
Double Centre
Yorkshire Toffee
Scots Clan

Real Irish Food Company
Relish
Jam

See also
Fox's Biscuits
Jacob's
Burton's Foods
Huntley & Palmers
Tunnock's
United Biscuits

References

External links
 Company home page

Food and drink companies of Ireland
Condiment companies